Kagi may refer to:

 Kagi (island), in the Kaafu Atoll
 KAGI, a radio station licensed to Grants Pass, Oregon
 The Japanese and Hokkien name for Chiayi, Taiwan
 Kagi chart, used for tracking price movements and to make decisions on purchasing stock
 John Henry Kagi (1835–1859), American abolitionist
 Kagi, a novel written by Jun'ichirō Tanizaki in 1956, published in English as The Key
 Kagi, a 1959 film based on the novel, also released as Odd Obsession
 Kagi.com was an e-commerce micropayment platform often used for shareware and e-book purchases, operating from Sept 1994 to July 2016.

See also
Kage (disambiguation)